Eshpai is a surname. It may refer to:

Andrei Yakovlevich Eshpai (1925–2015), Russian and Soviet composer of Mari descent
Andrei Andreyevich Eshpai (born 1956), Russian and Soviet film director, screenwriter and producer of Mari descent
Yakov Eshpai (1890–1963), Russian composer and music teacher